Elsa & Fred may refer to:
Elsa & Fred (2005 film), an Argentine film directed by Marcos Carnevale
Elsa & Fred (2014 film), the 2014 American remake of the Argentine film